The 1998 Icelandic Men's Football League Cup was the third staging of the Icelandic Men's League Cup. It featured 34 teams.

The competition started on 13 March 1998  and concluded on 26 August 1998 with KR beating Valur 6-5 on penalties in the final.

Details
 The 34 teams were divided into 5 groups of 6 teams and 1 group of 4 teams. In the 4 team group, each team played other teams twice. In the 6 team groups, each team plays one match with other teams in the group once. The top 2 teams from each group qualified for the 2nd round along with the best four 3rd placed teams from the groups with 6 teams.

Group stage

Group A

Group B

Group C

Group D

Group E

Group F

Knockout stage

Second round

Quarter-finals

Semi-finals

Final

See also
Icelandic Men's Football Cup
Knattspyrnusamband Íslands - The Icelandic Football Association
Icelandic First Division League 1998

References
RSSSF Page - Deildabikar 1998

1998 domestic association football cups
1998 in Icelandic football
Icelandic Men's Football League Cup